WXLY (102.5 FM) is a commercial radio station licensed to North Charleston, South Carolina, and serving the Charleston metropolitan area and South Carolina Lowcountry.  Owned by iHeartMedia, Inc., the station airs an adult contemporary radio format using the brand name Y102.5 and the slogan "Better Music For A Better Workday."  For much of November and December, it switches to all-Christmas music.  The radio studios and offices are on Houston Northcutt Boulevard in Mount Pleasant.

WXLY has an effective radiated power (ERP) of 100,000 watts, the maximum for non-grandfathered FM stations.  The transmitter is off Venning Road in Mount Pleasant, amid the towers for other Charleston-area FM and TV stations.  WXLY broadcasts using HD Radio technology.  Its HD-2 digital subchannel carries Radio By Grace, which in turn feeds two FM translators.

History
In April, 1958, the station signed on the air as WCSC-FM.  It was the FM counterpart to WCSC 1390 AM (now WSPO).  The stations were owned by WCSC, Inc. and the call sign stood for the city of license, Charleston, South Carolina.  WCSC-FM was powered at 50,000 watts, half its current output.

By the early 1980s, the call letters switched to WKTM and the station played album-oriented rock. The switch to the WXLY call sign and Y-102 name was made when the station flipped to country music. Later in the 1980s, the station played oldies and classic hits.

WXLY featured an oldies format for years. In 2004, the station's name was changed from "Oldies 102.5" to "Y102.5", to eliminate the usage of the word 'old.' In March 2005, WXLY shifted to 1970s based classic hits, even including some 1980s AC songs.  The new slogan was "The Greatest Hits of All Time." The evolution was taken a step further in late 2006 when the station adopted the slogan 'Music to Make You Feel Good', and unveiled a new, upbeat presentation with a new voice talent, new jingles, and a pastel-colored website.  The logo was altered to give it a more contemporary feel.

The music was once again adjusted later in 2007 to Mainstream AC from the 1970s through 2000s, following the flip of competitor WSUY.  The station's once-association with the oldies format has now been completely transformed to AC, except for the name, which has remained the same.

WXLY-HD2
WXLY's secondary HD Radio subchannel carries Adult contemporary.  That subchannel feeds two FM translator stations in Charleston.  104.9 W285DV and 105.1 W286AY.

References

External links
WXLY official website

Mainstream adult contemporary radio stations in the United States
Radio stations established in 1962
XLY
IHeartMedia radio stations